Belley is a commune in the Ain department in eastern France.

History 
Belley is of Roman origin, and in the 5th century became an episcopal see. It was the capital of the province of Bugey, which was a dependency of Savoy till 1601, when it was ceded to France. In 1385 the town was almost entirely destroyed by an act of incendiarism, but was municipalitysequently rebuilt by the dukes of Savoy, who surrounded it with ramparts of which little is left.

Belley was the birthplace of the epicure Jean-Anthelme Brillat-Savarin.

Ecclesiastical history 
Belley was the seat of the Bishop of Belley and the location of Belley Cathedral.  Belley is the home region of St. Peter Chanel, the famous 19th-century Marist missionary martyr and proto-martyr of Oceania.

Population

Climate 

Belley features an oceanic climate (Cfb) but with strong continental influences due to its far inland position and its proximity to the Jura mountains under the Köppen system. Both temperatures above  and air frosts are common.

Economy 
The town is famed for its cheese, la Tome de Belley, also known as Chevret or still "Le pavé d'Affinois". It is also at the centre of the Bugey wine region. It is also home to a sizeable Volvo production unit producing compact excavators, Comatel and Ciat.

Personalities 
Gertrude Stein and Alice B. Toklas lived at Bilignin near Belley through much of WW2. Stein wrote 'Wars I have seen' as a diaristic account of that time.
French gastronome Jean Anthelme Brillat-Savarin was born and lived in Belley and served as its mayor for some time.
 French writer Andrée Martinerie (1917–1997)  writer winner of the 1961 Prix des Libraires was born in Belley.

See also
Communes of the Ain department

References

External links

City´s Official Website (in French)
Gazetteer Entry

Communes of Ain
Subprefectures in France
Bugey